Azorhizophilus paspali  is a bacterium from the genus of Azorhizophilus which has been isolated from rhizosphere soil from the plant Paspalum notatum in Brazil.

References

Further reading

External links
Type strain of Azorhizophilus paspali at BacDive -  the Bacterial Diversity Metadatabase

Pseudomonadales
Bacteria described in 1966